The 2013–14 Persian Gulf Cup (also known as Iran Pro League) was the 31st season of Iran's Football League and 13th as Iran Pro League since its establishment in 2001. Esteghlal were the defending champions. The season featured 14 teams from the 2012–13 Persian Gulf Cup and two new teams promoted from the 2012–13 Azadegan League: Esteghlal Khuzestan and Gostaresh both as champions. The league started on 24 July 2013 and ended on 11 April 2014. Foolad won the Pro League title for the second time in their history (total second Iranian title).

Changes

Number of the teams
2013–14 Iran Pro League were the first season since 2006 that 16 teams participated in the competition. In the previous season, 18 teams participated in the league.

Rules and regulations
The Iranian football clubs who participate in 2013–14 Iran Pro League were allowed to have up to maximum 38 players (including up to maximum 4 non-Iranian players) in their player lists, which will be categorized in the following groups:
 Up to maximum 21 adult (without any age limit) players
 Up to maximum 9 under-23 players (i.e. the player whose birth is after 21 March 1990).
 Up to maximum 5 under-21 players (i.e. the player whose birth is after 1 January 1993).
 Up to maximum 3 under-19 players (i.e. the player whose birth is after 1 January 1995).

Teams

Stadia and locations

Number of teams by region

Personnel and kits

Note: Flags indicate national team as has been defined under FIFA eligibility rules. Players may hold more than one non-FIFA nationality.

Managerial changes

Before the start of the season

During the season

League table

Results

Positions by round

Clubs season-progress

Relegation play-offs
Fajr Sepasi as 14th-placed team faced play-off winner of 2013–14 Azadegan League, Paykan in a two-legged play-off.

Paykan won 1–0 on aggregate and promoted to the next season of Iran Pro League, Fajr Sepasi also relegated to the Azadegan League.

Season statistics

Top Goalscorers 

 Last updated: 11 April 2014 Source: FIFA.com

Top Assistants 

 Last updated: 11 April 2014 Sources:IPL Stats

Clean Sheets 

Last Update: 11 April 2014

Scoring 

First goal of the season: Adel Kolahkaj for  Esteghlal Khuzestan against Zob Ahan (24 July 2013)
Fastest goal of the season: 17 seconds, Kaveh Rezaei for Saipa against Mes Kerman (4 January 2014)
Latest goal of the season: 95 minutes and 12 seconds, Ali Karimi for Tractor Sazi against Mes Kerman (24 December 2013)
Largest winning margin: 6 goals
Mes Kerman 0–6 Persepolis (13 December 2013)
Highest scoring game: 6 goals
Fajr 2–4 Esteghlal (6 August 2013)
Zob Ahan 2–4 Tractor Sazi (6 August 2013)
Esteghlal Khuzestan 2–4 Naft Tehran (16 August 2013)
Damash 5–1 Zob Ahan (24 October 2013)
Mes Kerman 0–6 Persepolis (13 December 2013)
Saipa 3–3 Tractor Sazi (11 January 2014)
Malavan 4–2 Esteghlal (19 February 2014)
Most goals scored in a match by a single team: 6 goals
Mes Kerman 0–6 Persepolis (13 December 2013)
Most goals scored in a match by a losing team: 2 goals
Fajr 2–4 Esteghlal (6 August 2013)
Zob Ahan 2–4 Tractor Sazi (6 August 2013)
Esteghlal Khuzestan 2–4 Naft Tehran (16 August 2013)
Foolad 3–2 Esteghlal Khuzestan (23 August 2013)
Zob Ahan 3–2 Naft Tehran (31 August 2013)
Esteghlal Khuzestan 3–2 Rah Ahan (17 October 2013)
Saba Qom 3–2 Damash (26 January 2014)
Malavan 4–2 Esteghlal (19 February 2014)

Awards

Team of the Season

Goalkeeper: Nilson Corrêa Júnior (Persepolis)
Defence: Vahid Amiri (Naft), Jalal Hosseini (Persepolis), Hanif Omranzadeh (Esteghlal), Ali Hamoudi (Sepahan)
Midfield: Bakhtiar Rahmani (Foolad), Andranik Teymourian (Esteghlal), Amir Hossein Feshangchi (Malavan), Payam Sadeghian (Perspolis), Esmaeil Sharifat (Foolad)
Attack: Karim Ansarifard (Tractor Sazi)

Player of the Season

Andranik Teymourian was awarded as the best player of the season among Payam Sadeghian became second. Mohammad Abbaszadeh was also awarded as the best young player of the season.

Other awards

Hossein Faraki was awarded as the best coach of the season.

Attendances

Average home attendances

Highest attendances

Notes:Updated to games played on 11 April 2014. Source: Iranleague.ir

See also
 2013–14 Hazfi Cup
 2013–14 Azadegan League
 2013–14 Iran Football's 2nd Division
 2013–14 Iran Football's 3rd Division
 2013–14 Iranian Futsal Super League

Team season articles
2013–14 S.C. Damash season
2013–14 Esteghlal F.C. season
2013–14 Esteghlal Khuzestan F.C. season
2013–14 Foolad F.C. season
2013–14 Persepolis F.C. season
2013–14 Saba Qom F.C. season
2013–14 Sepahan F.C. season

References

External links
 2012–13 Persian Gulf Cup at PersianLeague
 2012–13 Persian Gulf Cup at Soccerway

Iran Pro League seasons
Iran
1